Mesra is a district in Mostaganem Province, Algeria. It was named after its capital, Mesra.

Municipalities
The district is further divided into 4 municipalities:
Mesra
Aïn Sidi Chérif
Touahria
Mansourah

Districts of Mostaganem Province